Marcus Morton (born April 20, 2004), better known by his stage name Redveil (stylized as redveil), is an American rapper, songwriter, and record producer from Prince George's County, Maryland. He produces most of his own instrumentals, occasionally also making beats for other artists. He has self-released three albums, Bittersweet Cry, Niagara, and Learn 2 Swim.

Artistry

Influence 
Growing up, Morton's parents would often play funk and soul music, which was an early influence to his sample choice, and his tone delivery. At age 11, Morton heard "Palace/Curse" by The Internet and Tyler, The Creator, which he credits as the "kickstart" to his musical interest. Shortly after, Redveil began producing his own music with FL Studio. In 2020, Morton described his music as "triumphant, bright and sunny."

While making his 2022 album Learn 2 Swim, Morton drew inspiration from New York Drill Music, and listened to local DMV area artists Xanman, Yung Manny, and No Savage during the creation.

Production 
Redveil has production credits on all of his album. His 2022 album, Learn 2 Swim, was entirely self produced.

Critical reception and praise from other artists 
A writer for online music publication Okayplayer called Morton "the DMV's next great hope" in an interview discussing his 2022 album, Learn 2 Swim. In 2020, another publication wrote: "[Redveil] is 16 rapping like he's in his 20s." Music publication Pitchfork gave Learn 2 Swim a score of 8.0.

His song "Drown" featuring Donte Thomas and D'Mari Harris has been cosigned by Tyler, The Creator. The track also made his year-end list of favorite songs in 2020. Other notable artists who have cosigned Redveil include JID, Deante' Hitchcock, and Denzel Curry, whose 2022 world tour he supported at select dates. Redveil was also a supporting act at 12 shows during Freddie Gibbs' Space Rabbit Tour, where Mike also performed.

Discography

Albums

Singles

Guest appearances

References

2004 births
Living people
Singer-songwriters from Maryland
American record producers
People from Prince George's County, Maryland
Musicians from Maryland